The GAZ-61 is a four wheel drive car from USSR manufacturer GAZ first introduced in 1938 by designer V. A. Gratchev, to replace his too-complex model GAZ-M2.

History 
It was made by putting a GAZ-M1 body on a four-wheel-drive chassis (one of the world's first all-wheel drive passenger cars).

The first version, produced from 1940 until 1941, was a five-seat four-door phaeton. Many supreme commanders of the Red Army headquarters used this car in 1941.

In 1941, the updated GAZ-61-73 was introduced.

The GAZ-61 was produced not only in civilian black but also in blue and Russian 4BO green, together with the typical cross-country tread tires.

References

External links
 GAZ-61-73, 4x4, Staff Car

GAZ Group vehicles
Cars introduced in 1938
Soviet automobiles
All-wheel-drive vehicles
Sport utility vehicles